Shaun Collier is a Canadian politician and former accountant who has served as the 10th and current mayor of Ajax since 2018. As mayor, he also serves on Durham Regional Council.

Education 
Collier has a chartered director degree from McMaster University. Prior to being elected, Collier served in the Canadian Armed Forces and was an accountant.

Career 
Collier was first elected to Ajax Town Council in 2003 in ward 1, defeating Ralph Golberg by just 47 votes. Collier was elected to Durham Regional Council in 2010, representing both Ajax wards 1 and 2. He was first elected as mayor in the 2018 municipal election on a platform of "economic development". One of the main issues of the campaign was the proposed enlargement of the Greenbelt which Collier supported, rather than building new homes. He won the election with 43% of the vote, defeating his nearest rival, fellow regional councillor Colleen Jordan, who won 33%. He replaced long-time mayor Steve Parish who did not seek re-election.

While in office as mayor, Collier was fined $13,000 by the Mutual Fund Dealers Association of Canada for allegedly forging financial documents while he was a mutual funds broker. Collier was subsequently suspended from holding a supervisory role in finance.

Collier endorsed Leslyn Lewis's candidacy in the 2020 Conservative Party of Canada leadership election.

References 

Living people
Mayors of places in Ontario
People from Ajax, Ontario
21st-century Canadian politicians
Canadian accountants
McMaster University alumni
Canadian Army personnel
Year of birth missing (living people)